Samuel Charnley (18 November 1902 – 1977) was a Scottish footballer who played for Wolverhampton Wanderers in the Football League.

Career
Born in Craigneuk, a suburb of Wishaw, North Lanarkshire, Charnley played for Burnbank Athletic before joining Wolverhampton Wanderers of the Football League Second Division in January 1925. He made his debut on 12 September 1925 in a 4–1 win against Portsmouth. After making 55 appearances in total, scoring once, he joined Midland League team York City in August 1928.

He captained York in the 1928–29 season, which was to be their last in the Midland League before being elected to the Football League. He left after making 55 appearances and scoring five goals to join Dartford in June 1929. He joined Kettering Town in September, before returning to Scottish football in May 1931.

Personal life
When Charnley joined Dartford, he secured jobs locally for family members who also moved to Kent; these included his brother and his wife, who were the parents of boxer Dave Charnley, born in the town in 1935. Sam later ran a pub in Dartford.

References

1902 births
Sportspeople from Wishaw
1977 deaths
Scottish footballers
Association football defenders
Wolverhampton Wanderers F.C. players
York City F.C. players
Dartford F.C. players
Kettering Town F.C. players
English Football League players
Midland Football League players
Burnbank Athletic F.C. players
Scottish Junior Football Association players
Footballers from North Lanarkshire